The Rizhao–Lankao Expressway, commonly referred to as the Rilan Expressway, is a  that connects the cities of Rizhao, in the province of Shandong, and Kaifeng, in the province of Henan. The expressway is named after the two localities at its termini, Rizhao, to the east, and Lankao County, a county under the administration of Kaifeng, to the west. Despite this namesake, the expressway's western terminus is actually in Xiangfu District, a neighbouring district in Kaifeng.

The expressway is a spur of G15 Shenyang–Haikou Expressway.

Route
The expressway is entirely in Shandong except for a small portion in Henan. It connects the following prefectural-level cities:
 Rizhao, Shandong
 Linyi, Shandong
 Jining, Shandong
 Heze, Shandong
 Kaifeng, Henan

Exit list

References

Chinese national-level expressways
Expressways in Shandong
Expressways in Henan